Mapenzi is a studio album by American jazz musician Harold Land and Blue Mitchell quintet. The album was released in 1977 by Concord label.

Reception
Allmusic awarded the album 4½ stars with reviewer Scott Yanow stating "this is an excellent example of 1977 hard bop".

Track listing
All compositions by Harold Land except as indicated
 "Mapenzi" - 5:15 
 "Rapture" - 5:08 
 "Habiba" (Kirk Lightsey) - 10:19 
 "Blue Silver" (Blue Mitchell) - 4:58 
 "Everything's Changed" (Kirk Lightsey) - 5:13 
 "Inner Voice" - 6:08 
 "Tres Senderos" - 5:29
Recorded at Sunwest Recording Studios in Hollywood, California on April 14, 1977.

Personnel
Blue Mitchell - trumpet, flugelhorn
Harold Land - tenor saxophone
Kirk Lightsey - piano 
Reggie Johnson - bass
Albert Heath - drums

References

 

Concord Records albums
Blue Mitchell albums
Harold Land albums
1977 albums
Albums produced by Carl Jefferson